Adolf Wilhelm Ferdinand Damaschke (born 24 November 1865, Berlin – 30 July 1935, Berlin) was a German politician and economist (Nationalökonom).

He founded the German League for Land Reform (Deutscher Bund für Bodenreform) in 1898, which he led until his death. He was influenced by Henry George.

Personal life

In 1904 he married Julie Gelzer, daughter of Heinrich Gelzer. They had 3 daughters. Damaschke died of cancer in 1935.

Literary works 
 Die Bodenreform, Grundsätzliches und Geschichtliches, 1902
 Bodenreform und Landwirtschaft, 1932
 Ein Kampf um Sozalismus und Nation, 1935

See also

 Silvio Gesell
 Henry George

External links

 
 

1865 births
1935 deaths
Politicians from Berlin
National-Social Association politicians
German economists
People from the Province of Brandenburg